Fadrique Enríquez may refer to:

 Fadrique Enríquez de Mendoza (1390–1473), great-grandson of Alfonso XI of Castile and his mistress Leonor de Guzmán
 Fadrique Enríquez de Velasco (1460–1538), grandson of the preceding